David Fuhrer is an American inventor and entrepreneur. David Fuhrer has licensed more than 300 toys, games and household products including toys such as Aqua Doodle, Nerf Vortex Football, and Twisty Petz. Brand Week Magazine (February 2009) refers to Fuhrer as "one of the more successful rainmakers in the toy industry" in an article written about his license of Guitar Hero Air Guitar Rocker. In January 2020, Fuhrer was named by Mojo Nation as one of the Top 100 Most Influential People in the global toy industry. On November 16, 2018, Fuhrer and his business partners, were honored with a Tagie Award https://toybook.com/chicago-toy-game-group-names-2017-tagie-award-winners/ as Innovators Of The Year for Twisty Petz (Spin Master Toys) www.twistypetz.com.

Currently, David Fuhrer is the Founder/Managing Director of BlueSquare Innovations. The company invests in and develops new product inventions.
Fuhrer is also known for his unusual ability to speak backwards fluently. 
He holds the Guinness book American record for Fastest Backwards Talker for his backwards recitation in 1989 of the Queen album A Night At The Opera in 10 min 19 sec.  Fuhrer has appeared on numerous television programs including The Tonight Show, Late Night with David Letterman and The Ellen DeGeneres Show. He has also been profiled in People Magazine and the Los Angeles Times Business section. Fuhrer is the co-author with Marvin Silbermintz of ''Backwords – The Secret Language of Talking Backwards and more Incredible Games, Stunts and Mind-Bending Word Fun!, and the creator of a board game also called Backwords.

In 1989, Fuhrer co-starred in the comedy/horror feature film "Monster High" for Columbia/TriStar Films.  He played the character Mel Anoma, 
Fuhrer grew up in Westchester County, NY, and now resides in Los Angeles, CA.

References

https://www.imdb.com/name/nm0297618/#actor

External links
 http://www.bluesquareinnovations.com
 https://www.imdb.com/name/nm0297618/

Living people
People from Westchester County, New York
1960 births
21st-century American inventors